Peter Campbell may refer to:

People
 Patrick Campbell (1684–1751), also known as Peter Campbell, British Army General and Member of Parliament
 Peter Campbell (Australian footballer, born 1875) (1875–1948), Australian rules footballer for Carlton
 Peter Campbell (Australian footballer, born 1938), Australian rules footballer for Geelong
 Peter Campbell (golfer) (born 1985), Canadian professional golfer
 Peter Campbell (Greenock Morton footballer) (fl. 1898), Scottish footballer (Greenock Morton, Burton Swifts and Scotland)
 Peter Campbell (naval officer) (1780–c. 1832), founded the Uruguayan Navy
 Peter Campbell (Rangers footballer) (c. 1850s–1883), Scottish footballer (Rangers, Blackburn Rovers and Scotland)
 Peter Campbell (tennis) (born 1950), Australian tennis player
 Peter Campbell (water polo) (born 1960), American water polo player
 Peter Walter Campbell (1926–2005), gay English Conservative Party libertarian
 Peter J. Campbell (1857–1919), American lawyer and politician
 Peter M. Campbell (1872–1954), member of the Legislative Assembly of Alberta
 Peter Campbell, a cofounder of Australian Software Innovation Forum

Fictional characters
 Pete Campbell, born Peter Dyckman Campbell, a character played by Vincent Kartheiser in the U.S. TV series Mad Men 
 Peter Campbell, a character played by Robert Urich in the U.S. TV series Soap